The Manitoba Bisons football team represents the University of Manitoba in the sport of Canadian football in U Sports. The program was the first of four U Sports football teams to have won back-to-back Vanier Cup championships, having won in 1969 and 1970. In total, the Bisons have won three Vanier Cup national championships and 11 Hardy Trophy conference championships. The Bisons are led by head coach, Brian Dobie, who has been the head coach since 1996.

Recent Vanier Cup
In 2007, the Bisons' football team won the Vanier Cup as the national champions in Canadian Interuniversity football, the first for the school in 37 years. Pat Gill, the manager, has been the manager for 40 years and was with the team during the 1969 and 1970 Vanier Cup teams. A big factor in the 2007 Vanier Cup was the injury to running back Matt Henry, who suffered and a broken femur in three places and severe muscle damage. However, in the end, kicker and punter Scott Dixon converted on all but one of his field goals and pinned the Saint Mary's Huskies deep several times. Dixon, in his rookie year, is tied for second all-time for most field goals in a game.

Recent season results

A. Manitoba forfeited two wins for using an ineligible player. Simon Fraser also used an ineligible player in a Manitoba loss, so the game was declared "no contest".

Manitoba Bisons in professional football

As of the end of the 2022 CFL season, eight former Bisons players are on CFL teams' rosters:
Gavin Cobb, Edmonton Elks
Nic Demski, Winnipeg Blue Bombers
Brock Gowanlock, Montreal Alouettes
Geoff Gray, Winnipeg Blue Bombers
Kienan Lafrance, Saskatchewan Roughriders
Landon Rice, Montreal Alouettes
Shai Ross, BC Lions
Zack Williams, Calgary Stampeders

In the 2016 NFL Draft, David Onyemata became the first Bison to be drafted into the NFL, being selected in the 4th round, 120th overall by the New Orleans Saints. As of the 2021 NFL season, he is on the Saints' active roster.

References

External links
 

 
U Sports football teams
Canadian football teams in Winnipeg
1920 establishments in Manitoba
Sports clubs established in 1920